These are the results of the athletics competition at the 2021 Islamic Solidarity Games which took place on 8–12 August 2022 in Konya, Turkey.

Men's results

100 metres

Heats – 8 AugustWind:Heat 1: +0.3 m/s, Heat 2: +1.3 m/s, Heat 3: +1.1 m/s, Heat 4: +4.0 m/s, Heat 5: +5.1 m/s

Semi-finals – 9 AugustWind:Heat 1: -0.2 m/s, Heat 2: +0.7 m/s, Heat 3: +0.1 m/s

Final – 9 AugustWind: +1.7 m/s

200 metres

Heats – 10 AugustWind:Heat 1: -1.0 m/s, Heat 2: +0.1 m/s, Heat 3: +1.3 m/s, Heat 4: +0.6 m/s, Heat 5: +1.3 m/s, Heat 6: +1.6 m/s

Semi-finals – 11 AugustWind:Heat 1: +3.6 m/s, Heat 2: +4.1 m/s, Heat 3: +4.2 m/s

Final – 11 AugustWind: +3.7 m/s

400 metres

Heats – 8 August

Final – 10 August

800 metres

Heats – 8 August

Final – 10 August

1500 metres

Heats – 11 August

Final – 12 August

5000 metres
8 August

10,000 metres
10 August

110 metres hurdles

Heats – 9 AugustWind:Heat 1: +1.4 m/s, Heat 2: +0.3 m/s

Final – 10 AugustWind: +2.1 m/s

400 metres hurdles

Heats – 8 August

Final – 9 August

3000 metres steeplechase
10 August

4 × 100 metres relay
Heats – 11 August

Final – 12 August

4 × 400 metres relay
12 August

High jump
12 August

Pole vault
9 August

Long jump
12 August

Triple jump
9 August

Shot put
8 August

Discus throw
11 August

Hammer throw
11 August

Javelin throw
12 August

Women's results

100 metres

Heats – 8 AugustWind:Heat 1: +2.4 m/s, Heat 2: +2.8 m/s, Heat 3: +3.5 m/s, Heat 4: +3.9 m/s

Semi-finals – 9 AugustWind:Heat 1: -0.8 m/s, Heat 2: 0.0 m/s

Final – 9 AugustWind: +1.1 m/s

200 metres

Heats – 10 AugustWind:Heat 1: +2.0 m/s, Heat 2: +1.3 m/s, Heat 3: +3.3 m/s, Heat 4: +1.5 m/s

Semi-finals – 11 AugustWind:Heat 1: +1.1 m/s, Heat 2: +3.8 m/s

Final – 11 AugustWind: +2.9 m/s

400 metres

Heats – 8 August

Final – 10 August

800 metres
9 August

1500 metres
12 August

5000 metres
11 August

10,000 metres
8 August

100 metres hurdles

Heats – 10 AugustWind:Heat 1: +1.5 m/s, Heat 2: +0.2 m/s

Final – 11 AugustWind: +3.7 m/s

400 metres hurdles
9 August

3000 metres steeplechase
10 August

4 × 100 metres relay
12 August

4 × 400 metres relay
12 August

High jump
11 August

Pole vault
8 August

Long jump
Qualification – 8 August

Final – 9 August

Triple jump
11 August

Shot put
8 August

Discus throw
9 August

Hammer throw
8 August

Javelin throw
10 August

Mixed results

4 × 400 metres relay
11 August

References
Full men's results
Full women's results

Islamic Solidarity Games
2022